Carlos Franco Sodi (March 31, 1904April 24, 1961) was a Mexican lawyer, professor, and jurist who served as the Attorney General of Mexico during the presidency of Adolfo Ruiz Cortines from 1952 to 1956. He founded, alongside others, the Mexican Academy of Criminal Sciences.

References 

Attorneys general of Mexico
Mexican jurists
Mexican legal writers
20th-century Mexican lawyers
Carlos
Mexican people of Italian descent
1904 births
1961 deaths
People from Oaxaca City